If you were looking for the song by The Vapors called "Spring Collection", see here.

Spring Collaboration is a collaboration EP by Luke Vibert and BJ Cole.

Track listing

CD version
"Swing Lite - Alright"
"Aahfternoon"
"Party Animal (Mr. Scruff's Beats Mix)"
Remix: Mr. Scruff
"Swing Lite - Alright (Heavy Swing Version by Metrophonics)"
Remix: Metrophonics

12" vinyl version
Side A
"Aahfternoon"
Side B
"Swing Lite - Alright (Heavy Swing Version by Metrophonics)"
Remix: Metrophonics
"Party Animal (Mr. Scruff's Beats Mix)"
Remix - Mr. Scruff

References

B. J. Cole albums
2000 EPs
Luke Vibert EPs